A Roman shower is a type of architecturally designed shower stall that does not require a door or curtain.

These showers are often used as disabled-accessible showers in hotels.  They may also be known as "roll-in showers".

References

Plumbing
Bathing